Theodhor "Dhori" Arbëri (born 3 March 1953) is a former FK Tomori Berat football player, he played for more than a decade in his home city Berat.

Personal life
He is the older brother of Arben Arbëri and Klodian Arbëri, also FK Tomori Berat former football players. His son is Polizoi Arbëri, who has played for Albania national under-21 football team. Gersi Arbëri, his older son is now the coach of FK Tomori Berat.

Theodhor Arbëri is since 2014 coach of Tomori U12.

References

External links
 

1953 births
Living people
Sportspeople from Berat
Association football forwards
Albanian footballers
Shkëndija Tiranë players
FK Tomori Berat players
Kategoria Superiore players
Albanian football managers
FK Tomori Berat managers